Fumet may refer to

 Dynam-Victor Fumet (1867–1949), French composer and organist
 Raphaël Fumet (1898–1979), French composer and organist
 A kind of stock (food)

See also 
Fumette